The Tutura is a river in Irkutsk Oblast, Russia.

The settlement of Chikan is located by the Tutura, near the confluence with the Chikan river, its main tributary. Other inhabited places near the river are Tutura and Kelora. The Tutura basin is one of the areas of Russia traditionally inhabited by Evenks.

Course  
The Tutura is a right tributary of the Lena which flows across the Lena-Angara Plateau. It has its sources in the Bolshoy Tutura Lake, Kachugsky District, to the NNE of Irkutsk. It flows first westwards, then in its middle course it heads in a roughly northern direction across the highland area. In its lower reaches its channel widens and near Chikan village it turns WSW, meandering across a floodplain. Finally the Tutura meets the right bank of the Lena by Zhigalovo, the  administrative center of Zhigalovsky District,  from its mouth.

The river freezes between October and May. Summer floods are a common occurrence.

Flora and fauna
The vegetation of the Tutura river basin is characterized by mountain taiga. Permafrost is prevalent in the river basin.
The main fish species in the river are carp, crucian carp, asp, pike, chub, lenok, whitefish, bream and Amur catfish.

See also
List of rivers of Russia

References

External links 
Тутура, Жигалово, путешествие по Сибирским краям!
Тутура

Rivers of Irkutsk Oblast
Zhigalovsky District